The Nepal national football team is the national under-20 team of Nepal that represents the Nepal in international football competitions in the FIFA U-20 World Cup qualifiers and the AFC Youth Championship, as well as any other under-20 international football tournaments. The team is governed by the All Nepal Football Association and is a member of the Asian Football Confederation (AFC). The youth side play their home games at Dasarath Rangasala Stadium located at Tripureswhor in Kathmandu alongside the senior team.

History

Recent results and fixtures

2010s

2000s

Competitive record
*Denotes draws include knockout matches decided on penalty kicks.
**Red border color indicates tournament was held on home soil.
***Denotes tournament played in league format (as opposed to playoff format)

FIFA U-20 World Cup

AFC U-19 Championship

SAFF U-19 Championship

Current squad
The following 20 players were called up for 2022 SAFF championship.

Recent Callups
In total, 50 players had been called up initially. However, 20 or so had to be sent back due to physicality and inexperience. Currently, 30 players are undergoing training.

See more
Nepal national under-23 football team
Nepal national under-17 football team
AFC Youth Championship

References

External links
 GoalNepal: Nepal U-19 Profile

Asian national under-20 association football teams
under-20